James "Jim" L. Adams (October 2, 1921 – August 6, 2014) was an American politician who served as a member of the Minnesota House of Representatives from 1955 to 1974.

Background 
Born in Iron Mountain, Michigan, Adams moved to Minneapolis, Minnesota as a child. He served in the United States Army Corps of Engineers during World War II and later attended the Dunwoody College of Technology. Adams worked as an electrician. Adams then served in the Minnesota House of Representatives from 1955 to 1974 as a Democrat.

He died in Minneapolis, Minnesota.

Notes

1921 births
2014 deaths
People from Iron Mountain, Michigan
Politicians from Minneapolis
Military personnel from Minneapolis
American electricians
Democratic Party members of the Minnesota House of Representatives
United States Army personnel of World War II